Juan Francisco Reyes López (10 July 1938 – 10 January 2019) was a Guatemalan politician who served as Vice President of Guatemala from 14 January 2000 to 14 January 2004 in the cabinet of president Alfonso Portillo.

In 1989, Reyes was one of the founders of the Guatemalan Republican Front. He was elected Deputy to the Congress of Guatemala for two terms between 1990 and 1998.

References

Vice presidents of Guatemala
Institutional Republican Party politicians
Members of the Congress of Guatemala
1938 births
2019 deaths